David Oluwale (1930–1969) was a British Nigerian who drowned in the River Aire in Leeds, West Riding of Yorkshire, in 1969. The events leading to his drowning have been described as "the physical and psychological destruction of a homeless, black man whose brutal, systematic harassment was orchestrated by the Leeds city police force." Oluwale's death resulted in the first successful prosecution of British police officers for involvement in the death of a black person. The precise sequence of events that led to Oluwale entering the river—whether he was deliberately thrown, chased or fell accidentally—have never been officially established, although two independent witnesses testified that they saw uniformed police officers chasing him alongside the river on the night he is believed to have drowned.

Oluwale's body was recovered from the section of the river between Knostrop Weir and Skelton Grange Power Station on 4 May 1969. The death was not treated as suspicious by the police or the coroner. In October 1970, a whistleblower within Leeds City Police revealed that Oluwale had been the victim of serious and sustained mistreatment by senior officers at Milgarth Police Station, Leeds, and an investigation, led by London's Scotland Yard, was opened. It was discovered that Oluwale had been subjected to "systemic, varied and brutal" violence by at least two officers, which "would often occur in the presence of other [officers], who made no effort to intervene."

In November 1971, former-Inspector Geoffrey Ellerker—by this time already serving a prison sentence for his involvement in covering up the circumstances of the death of a 69-year-old woman—and Sergeant Kenneth Kitching went on trial for the manslaughter of Oluwale. The trial received national media coverage, but justice and civil rights campaigners considered it to be a whitewash, presenting a deliberately negative portrait of Oluwale as "a wild animal" and "a menace to society", while failing to call any of the witnesses whose testimonies challenged this narrative. During the trial, the judge, Mr. Justice Hinchcliffe—who at one point described Oluwale as "a dirty, filthy, violent vagrant"—directed the jury to find the defendants not guilty of manslaughter, perjury and assaults occasioning grievous bodily harm. The jury returned unanimous verdicts of guilty relating to four assaults which took place between August 1968 and February 1969. Ellerker was sentenced to three years' imprisonment, and Kitching to 27 months.

Background
Oluwale was born in Lagos, Nigeria, in 1930. In August 1949, he hid on board SS Temple Bar, a cargo ship destined for Hull, England. When the ship docked in Hull on 3 September 1949, he was handed over to the authorities. Under the British Nationality Act 1948 Oluwale was considered a British subject and not an illegal immigrant, but he was charged as a stowaway under the Merchant Shipping Act 1894. He was sentenced to 28 days' imprisonment, served in Armley Gaol, Leeds, and Northallerton Prison, Northallerton.

Following his release from prison on 3 October 1949, Oluwale—who had served an apprenticeship as a tailor in Nigeria—headed to Leeds where there was a large textile and clothing industry.

In 1953, Oluwale was charged with disorderly conduct and assault following a police raid on a nightclub. He subsequently served a 28-day sentence. In prison it was reported he suffered from hallucinations, possibly because of damage sustained from a truncheon blow during the arrest. He was transferred to Menston Asylum in Leeds (later called High Royds Hospital, now closed) where he spent the next eight years. He was treated with a variety of techniques, allegedly including electroconvulsive therapy and various drugs (hospital records have since been lost).

Upon release Oluwale was unable to hold down a job and a permanent residence, and quickly became homeless. Friends reported that he was a shadow of his former self, and had lost all confidence. As a black immigrant in 1960s Britain, his choices of lodging and employment were also limited in his lifetime (the Race Relations Act outlawing discrimination in both only received Royal Assent in October 1968).

During this time he regularly moved between London, Sheffield and Leeds. He found himself in trouble with the Leeds police again several times and accused the police of harassing him. In late 1965, he was returned to High Royds Hospital, where he spent another two years. Following release he was once again homeless and lived on the street.

Leeds City Police
Contemporary police records show that 1968 saw his first recorded contact with Sergeant Kenneth Kitching and Inspector Geoffrey Ellerker in Leeds. The actions of the two officers would allegedly lead to Oluwale's death, although several other police officers were also involved with harassing Oluwale during this time.

In the subsequent enquiry and manslaughter/assault trial against Kitching and Ellerker, it was stated they regularly beat up Oluwale, often kicking him in the groin and, on one occasion, urinating on him. Often they made him bow before them on his hands and knees, during which they would kick away his arms so his head hit the pavement. They referred to this as "penance". They also verbally abused him, referring to him as a "lame darkie". On several occasions they drove him out of Leeds in police vehicles, abandoning him on the outskirts in the early morning. Their intention was to force Oluwale to leave Leeds and not return. However, he viewed Leeds as his home and made his way back each time.

In the early hours of 17 April 1969, Kitching found Oluwale sleeping in a shop doorway, and summoned Ellerker. They both beat Oluwale with their truncheons and the last reported sighting of Oluwale was of him running away from the officers towards the River Aire. It was there that his body was found two weeks later. He was buried in a pauper's grave and no suspicious circumstances were attached to his death at the time.

Scotland Yard enquiry
In 1970, a young police recruit reported to a senior officer that he had heard gossip from colleagues about the severe way Kitching and Ellerker had treated Oluwale. This report might have been prompted by fraud charges that were on-going against Ellerker. An enquiry was launched, carried out by Scotland Yard, and sufficient evidence was gathered to prompt manslaughter, perjury and grievous bodily harm (GBH) charges being brought against Kitching and Ellerker in 1971.

Manslaughter trial
During the enquiry and trial, a catalogue of physical abuse came to light, mostly carried out by Kitching and Ellerker. It was revealed they had taken special interest in Oluwale and asked colleagues to let them personally handle incidents relating to him. They specifically targeted him in the early hours of the morning, when there was nobody about and he could usually be found sleeping in shop doorways. Additionally, it was found that racist terms were used on paperwork relating to Oluwale, such as scribbling "wog" in the space reserved for nationality. However, despite this, the trial made no mention of racism and was centred on police brutality. Several trial witnesses described Oluwale as a dangerous man, and the trial judge referred to him as a "dirty, filthy, violent vagrant". However, this is contrary to the statements of witnesses collected during the earlier enquiry, who described Oluwale as unassuming and even cheerful. One of these witnesses was Yorkshire Evening Post reporter Tony Harney. However, their statements were not featured in the trial.

On the directions of the judge, manslaughter charges were dropped during the trial. Ellerker was found guilty of three assaults against Oluwale and Kitching of two assaults. They were found not guilty of causing GBH. Ellerker was sentenced to three years in prison, and Kitching received 27 months.

Cultural legacy

Literature 

Although Oluwale's story caused a national scandal at the time (thanks in part to the radio play Smiling David written by Jeremy Sandford), it had been all but forgotten until police paperwork detailing the case was declassified under the thirty-year rule. This was used by Kester Aspden to write the book Nationality: Wog, The Hounding of David Oluwale, published in 2007, which returned the story to the public eye.

The Remembering Oluwale anthology was published in 2016 and its many varied entries cover "the issues that David endured: mental health distress, incarceration, police brutality, destitution and homelessness—all linked to his status as a migrant from Nigeria, a British citizen who happened to be black. The 26 long-listed entries are in the book, along with already published work by Caryl Phillips, Kester Aspden, Ian Duhig, Linton Kwesi Johnson, Zodwa Nyoni, Sai Murray and The Baggage Handlers".

Theatre 
Aspden's book has been adapted by Oladipo Agboluaje into a stage play, first performed at the West Yorkshire Playhouse in February 2009, which critics described as "a richly emotional play which proves its point without coming across like it has a point to prove".

In 2018, a production named Freeman by the Strictly Arts Theatre was put on at the Pleasance Theatre in London. It was a play about systematic racism within legal institutions, and how many people have suffered from police brutality. David Oluwale was one of the characters.

Exhibitions 
Oluwale's story is also the subject of a film installation by Corinne Silva, entitled Wandering Abroad, which premiered at Leeds Art Gallery in 2009.

In 2019, the David Oluwale Memorial Association led a series of events to mark the 50th anniversary of his death. Events included an exhibition at The Tetley, readings by Linton Kwesi Johnson and Jackie Kay and a vigil at his graveside in Killingbeck Cemetery.

Memorials

David Oluwale Bridge 
In March 2022 a new bridge over the River Aire, crossing from Sovereign Street to Water Lane, and known as the David Oluwale Bridge, was installed.

Blue plaque 

On 25 April 2022 a blue plaque commemorating Oluwale was unveiled on Leeds Bridge by Leeds Civic Trust and the David Oluwale Memorial Association. The same evening the plaque was stolen from the bridge; West Yorkshire Police began an investigation, which treated the theft as a hate crime. The plaque was then replaced but was then vandalised the same night of replacement, another temporary plaque was then installed.

A "spate of racist graffiti" appeared on the bridge and at the civic trust offices.

References

Notes

Bibliography

Further reading

1930 births
1969 deaths
Victims of police brutality
Anti-black racism in England
Police misconduct in England
Deaths by person in England
1969 in England
May 1969 events in the United Kingdom
Black British history
Racially motivated violence against black people
Residents of Lagos